Alonzo Edwin Branch (April 30, 1874 – December 15, 1925), also known as A. Edwin Branch, was an American football coach. He served as the head coach at the University of Nebraska in 1899 and at Miami University in Oxford, Ohio in 1900, compiling a career college football record of 1–11–1.

In 1899, Branch led the Nebraska to an exhibition win against Lincoln High School and one victory over Drake. Nebraska had their first losing season under Branch and after the season, he was replaced by Walter C. Booth. Branch's winning percentage of .167 is the lowest in the history of the Nebraska Cornhuskers football program.

Head coaching record

References

1874 births
1925 deaths
Miami RedHawks football coaches
Nebraska Cornhuskers football coaches
Harvard University alumni
Williams College alumni
Sportspeople from Boston